Hilda Muhlhauser Richards was an American government official during World War I. She aimed to protect women's rights as chief of the Woman's Division of the Federal Employment Service in the United States Department of Labor.

Early life
Hilda Muhlhauser was from Cleveland, Ohio, the daughter of Frederick Muhlhauser and Antoinette Kahnheimer Muhlhauser. Her father, born in Switzerland, was the owner of the Northern Ohio Woolen Mills. As a young woman, inspired after a visit to Hull House, Hilda Muhlhauser worked in a settlement house in Cleveland.

Career
In 1909 Hilda Muhlhauser spoke at a meeting of the Council of Jewish Women in Buffalo, about her work on the Council of Educational Alliance in Cleveland. She was head of the Girls' and Women's Employment Bureau in that city. She was on the board of the Consumers' League of Ohio, the Woman's Suffrage Association, and the Woman's City Club of Cleveland. Muhlhauser attended the Panama–Pacific International Exposition in 1915 as a representative on Cleveland.

In 1915 she was the only woman named to an advisory board of twelve national experts, to work on coordinating employment policy at federal, state, and municipal levels. She published a report on public employment bureaus during this time. She was vice president of the International Association of Public Employment Services from 1915 to 1917, focusing on the employment issues of women and girls.

In January 1918, Richards was appointed chief of the Woman's Division of the Federal Employment Service in the U. S. Department of Labor. Her policy positions included "equal pay for equal work" and the eight-hour work day. "We will protect the women hired to replace men from exploitation by unscrupulous employers," she explained of her division's wartime mission. She resigned her post in August 1918, after the program was reorganized. Her successor was Margaretta Neale.

In 1919, she wrote a syndicated newspaper column titled "Woman and her Job."

Personal life
In 1917, Hilda Muhlhauser married Charles Russell Richards (1865–1936), director of Cooper Union.

References

American suffragists
People from Cleveland
Activists from Ohio
Year of birth missing
Year of death missing